Randy or Randall Jones may refer to:

Sports
Randy Jones (baseball) (born 1950), American baseball pitcher
Randy Jones (bobsleigh) (born 1969), American bobsledder
Randy Jones (ice hockey) (born 1981), Canadian hockey defenseman in the NHL

Other
Randy Jones (singer) (born 1952), former member of the Village People
Randy Jones (drummer) (1944–2016), British-born American jazz musician